The 2019–20 Argentine Primera B Nacional, also known as the 2019–20 Primera Nacional, was the 35th season of the Primera B Nacional, the second tier of Argentine football. The season began on 15 August 2019 and was scheduled to end in May 2020. Thirty-two teams compete in the league, twenty-one returning from the 2018–19 season, four teams that were relegated from Primera División, two teams promoted from Federal A and five from B Metropolitana.

Due to the COVID-19 pandemic, the Argentine Football Association suspended the tournament on 17 March 2020. On 28 April 2020 AFA announced the abandonment of the competition as well as the culmination of the 2019–20 season in all of its leagues, with no clubs promoted or relegated. AFA also announced that a decision on a suitable method for promotion from the Primera Nacional and lower tiers would be reached in due time.

Club information

Stadia and locations

Zone A

Results

Zone B

Results

Season statistics

Top scorers
{| class="wikitable" style="text-align:center"
|-
!Rank
!Player
!Club
!Goals
|-
|1
|align="left"| Pablo Magnín
|align="left"|Sarmiento (J)
|15
|-
|2
|align="left"| Pablo Vegetti
|align="left"|Belgrano
|14
|-
|3
|align="left"| Luciano Pons
|align="left"|San Martín (T)
|12
|-
|4
|align="left"| Germán Rivero
|align="left"|Alvarado
|11
|-
|5
|align="left"| Luis Eduardo López
|align="left"|Atlanta
|10
|-
|rowspan=2|6
|align="left"| Martín Comachi
|align="left"|Agropecuario Argentino
|rowspan=2|9
|-
|align="left"| Mateo Bajamich
|align="left"|Instituto
|-
|8
|align="left"| Emanuel Dening
|align="left"|Tigre
|8
|-
|rowspan=6|9
|align="left"| Ijiel Protti
|align="left"|Atlético de Rafaela
|rowspan=6|7
|-
|align="left"| Francisco González
|align="left"|Estudiantes (BA)
|-
|align="left"| Bruno Sepúlveda
|align="left"|Estudiantes (RC)
|-
|align="left"| Gonzalo Castillejos
|align="left"|Gimnasia y Esgrima (J)
|-
|align="left"| Leandro González
|align="left"|Quilmes
|-
|align="left"| Nicolás Messiniti
|align="left"|Temperley
|}

See also
 2019–20 Argentine Primera División
 2019–20 Torneo Federal A
 2019–20 Primera B Metropolitana
 2019–20 Copa Argentina

References

External links
 soccerway.com
 Ascenso del Interior  
 Interior Futbolero 
 Promiedos  

Primera B Nacional seasons
2019–20 in Argentine football leagues
Primera B Nacional